Nový Čas (literally meaning New Time in English) is a tabloid and the best-selling daily in Slovakia.

History and profile
Nový Čas was founded in 1990 after the Velvet Revolution, initially as a rough copy of the Austrian Kronen Zeitung. The newspaper is owned and published by Ringier Axel Springer, a Swiss company based in Zurich. The former owner of the paper was Gruner + Jahr. Its content is tabloid journalism gutter press. The widely read supplement "Nový Čas víkend" is added on Saturdays. In 2006 a Sunday version of Nový Čas was introduced: Nový Čas Nedeľa (New Time Sunday).

The circulation of Nový Čas was 157,000 copies in 2003 and 167,000 in 2004. It was 189,000 copies in 2006 and 172,000 copies in 2008. The 2011 circulation of the paper was 136,000 copies. The circulation of the paper was 121,700 copies in 2012. The paper had a circulation of 98,815 copies in June 2014.

References

External links 
 čas.sk – official website 

1990 establishments in Slovakia
Newspapers published in Slovakia
Publications established in 1990
Slovak-language newspapers
Slovakian news websites